Máté Papp (born 12 March 1993) is a Hungarian professional footballer who plays for Dunaújváros.

Club statistics

Updated to games played as of 19 October 2014.

References
MLSZ 

1993 births
Living people
Footballers from Budapest
Hungarian footballers
Hungary youth international footballers
Association football midfielders
Fehérvár FC players
Dunaújváros PASE players
Puskás Akadémia FC players
Soproni VSE players
Soroksár SC players
Csákvári TK players
Nyíregyháza Spartacus FC players
Nemzeti Bajnokság I players
Nemzeti Bajnokság II players
Nemzeti Bajnokság III players